Thobias Fredriksson (born 4 April 1975 in Dals Rostock, Dalsland) is a Swedish former cross-country skier who competed since 2000. He won two medals at the 2006 Winter Olympics in Turin with a gold in the team sprint and a bronze in the individual sprint events.

Fredriksson also won two medals in the individual sprint events at the FIS Nordic World Ski Championships with a gold in 2003 and a bronze in 2005.
After the 2010 season, Fredriksson retired.

Thobias has a brother, Mathias Fredriksson, at the same professional level.

Cross-country skiing results
All results are sourced from the International Ski Federation (FIS).

Olympic Games
 2 medals – (1 gold, 1 bronze)

World Championships
 2 medals – (1 gold, 1 bronze)

World Cup

Season standings

Individual podiums
 5 victories – (5 ) 
 20 podiums – (19 , 1 )

Team podiums
 2 victories – (2 )
 8 podiums – (1 , 7 )

See also
List of Olympic medalist families

References
 
 Fredriksson retires

Specific

External links
 
 

1975 births
Living people
People from Mellerud Municipality
Cross-country skiers from Västra Götaland County
Swedish male cross-country skiers
Cross-country skiers at the 2002 Winter Olympics
Cross-country skiers at the 2006 Winter Olympics
Olympic gold medalists for Sweden
Olympic bronze medalists for Sweden
Olympic cross-country skiers of Sweden
Olympic medalists in cross-country skiing
FIS Nordic World Ski Championships medalists in cross-country skiing
Medalists at the 2006 Winter Olympics
Axa SC skiers